Rojnai (also Romanized as Rojnaʿī; also known as Rūjneh’ī, Roshanai, Rowshanā’ī, Rowshaneh, and Rowshangān) is a village in Darmian Rural District, in the Central District of Darmian County, South Khorasan Province, Iran. At the 2006 census, its population was 36, in 9 families.

References 

Populated places in Darmian County